Victoria Entwistle (born 15 September 1968) is an English actress. She is known for portraying the role of Janice Battersby in the ITV soap opera Coronation Street.

Early life 
Entwistle grew up in Accrington; her father owned a newsagent's in Clayton-le-Moors. She attended Rhyddings High School in Oswaldtwistle, and at the age of sixteen, she commuted to Blackpool to study drama, whilst working nights at a local supermarket. For some time, she worked as a Bluecoat entertainer at Pontin's in Devon before she won a scholarship to attend Drama Centre London, from which she graduated in 1991.

Career 
Entwistle returned to the stage as Hanna in Merlin before gaining the role of Amy in BBC's Our Tune. Entwistle then played Maxine Graham in Like A Virgin, and was spotted by Granada Television casting director Judy Hayfield. She was offered the role of machinist Janice Lee in Coronation Street and made her on-screen debut on 6 January 1997. She also starred in an episode of The Bill in 1997. The following month, Entwistle was told that she would be playing the mother of the Battersbys.

On 2 August 2010, Entwistle's departure after fourteen years on the show was confirmed. Soap bosses said the actress "agonised" over her decision, but decided the show's fiftieth anniversary year was the right time to say goodbye.

Since leaving Coronation Street, Entwistle has worked on the stage. She starred as the Wicked Queen in Blackpool's 2011 production of Snow White and the Seven Dwarves and in 2012 toured in Funny Peculiar, an award-winning play by Mike Stott, with Suzanne Shaw, Craig Gazey, Dominic Cazenove and Gemma Bissix.

From January to August 2013, she played the role of Madame Thénardier in Les Misérables on the West End.

On 22 August 2013, Vicky entered the Celebrity Big Brother house along with former on-screen husband, Bruce Jones to compete in the twelfth series. She was paid £150,000.

From 13 December 2017 until 7 January 2018, Entwistle appeared in the Christmas pantomime Sleeping Beauty at the Pavilion Theatre in Rhyl, North Wales. She played the character Carrabosse which she has also played in Llandudno Pantomime in 2013.

Personal life 
In January 2001, Entwistle was arrested after allegedly head-butting a fan of Coronation Street. The charges against her were dropped.

Filmography

Stage
 The Importance of Being Earnest as Miss Prism (2019, Octagon Theatre, Bolton)

References

External links

1968 births
Living people
English television actresses
English soap opera actresses
People from Accrington